The 3000 metres steeplechase has been held as an event at the IAAF World Championships in Athletics in the men's division since 1983 and in the women's division since 2005.  It can be noted for a series of lengthy winning streaks in the men's division, where Kenyan born athletes have won every championship since 1991.  Moses Kiptanui won three in a row, 1987-1995, Saif Saaeed Shaheen, born Steven Cherono, won two in 2003-5.  The longest winning streak in any event in the World Championships, is 5 in a row by Ezekiel Kemboi, 2009-15.  More remarkably, Kemboi prefaced that streak with a streak of three silver medals, 2003-7.  2007 champion Brimin Kipruto has a complete set of medals, including two bronze.  Kenya has also fared well in the women's division winning 9 of the 21 medals issued to date.  2013 women's champion Milcah Chemos Cheywa also has a complete set of medals.

Men's champions

Multiple medalists

Medalists by country

Women's champions

Multiple medalists

Medalists by country 

Events at the World Athletics Championships
 
World Championships in Athletics